Tha Bizness is an American record production and songwriting team from Seattle, Washington, composed of Justin "Henny" Henderson and Christopher John "Dow Jones" Whitacre. Tha Bizness have produced songs for several prominent artists, including Chris Brown, Ne-Yo, Jay-Z, Snoop Dogg, Nas, Ice Cube, 50 Cent, and Kendrick Lamar, among others. In 2009, they received a Producer of the Year nomination at the BET Hip Hop Awards.

History
Henny, who was previously a singer under the name "J Henn," and Dow Jones, who was previously a mixtape DJ, joined forces to form the production team "Tha Bizness." Dow used his mixtape series, titled "Play Your Position," to promote their beats. Eventually, they were noticed by West Coast artists, for whom they produced songs for mixtapes. In 2007, Sha Money XL contacted the duo via Myspace and offered the duo a production deal with G-Unit Records and Sha Money's management team, Teamwork Music.

Tha Bizness achieved mainstream success with the production of "Every Girl" from Young Money's 2009 album "We Are Young Money.d The instrumental was originally intended to be for R. Kelly, for whom Tha Bizness had previously collaborated on "Hair Braider" in early 2008, but Lil Wayne heard the beat and bought it first. Tha Bizness also produced another song on the same album, titled "Ms. Parker."

Production discography

Singles produced

References

External links
 
 
 
 
 

Record production duos
American songwriting teams
Musical groups established in 2004
Musical groups from Seattle
Hip hop duos
West Coast hip hop groups
American hip hop record producers
American musical duos